1361 Leuschneria, provisional designation , is a carbonaceous asteroid from the outer regions of the asteroid belt, approximately 30 kilometers in diameter. It was discovered on 30 August 1935, by Belgian astronomer Eugène Delporte at Uccle Observatory in Belgium, and named after American astronomer Armin Otto Leuschner.

Orbit 

Leuschneria is a carbonaceous C-type asteroid that orbits the Sun at a distance of 2.7–3.5 AU once every 5 years and 5 months (1,976 days). Its orbit has an eccentricity of 0.13 and an inclination of 22° with respect to the ecliptic.
It was first observed at Johannesburg Observatory, extending the body's observation arc by 3 days prior to its official discovery observation at Uccle.

Naming 

This minor planet was named after American astronomer Armin Otto Leuschner (1868–1953), on a proposal by Sylvain Arend during a visit to Berkeley, where Leuschner was the director of the Leuschner Observatory at University of California. He is known for his books Celestial Mechanics and The Minor Planets of the Hecuba Group. Naming citation was first mentioned in The Names of the Minor Planets by Paul Herget in 1955. The lunar crater Leuschner is also named in his honor.

Physical characteristics

Lightcurve 

In May and June 2015, two rotational lightcurves of Leuschneria were obtained from photometric observations by Maurice Clark at Preston Gott Observatory of Texas Tech University, United States, and by Giovanni Casalnuovo at Eurac Observatory in Bolzano, Italy. Lightcurve analysis gave a rotation period of 12.0893 and 9.646 hours with a brightness amplitude of 0.75 and 0.19 magnitude, respectively.

Diameter and albedo 

According to the surveys carried out by the Japanese Akari satellite and NASA's Wide-field Infrared Survey Explorer with its subsequent NEOWISE mission, Leuschneria measures between 29.637 and 33.47 kilometers in diameter and its surface has a respective albedo between 0.066 and 0.0779. The Collaborative Asteroid Lightcurve Link derives an albedo of 0.0773 and a diameter of 30.16 kilometers with an absolute magnitude of 11.0.

References

External links 
 Asteroid Lightcurve Database (LCDB), query form (info )
 Dictionary of Minor Planet Names, Google books
 Asteroids and comets rotation curves, CdR – Observatoire de Genève, Raoul Behrend
 Discovery Circumstances: Numbered Minor Planets (1)-(5000) – Minor Planet Center
 
 

001361
Discoveries by Eugène Joseph Delporte
Named minor planets
19350830